Singam II is a 2013 Indian Tamil-language action film written and directed by Hari. A sequel to the 2010 film Singam and the second installment in the Singam film series, the film stars Suriya, Hansika Motwani, Anushka Shetty, Danny Sapani. This film is the second installment in the Singam film series. Produced by S. Lakshman Kumar, its music and score was composed by Devi Sri Prasad. The film was released on 5 July 2013.

Plot
After having killed extortionist Mayil Vaaganam, police officer Durai Singam  covertly meets Home Minister Ramanathan  on the highways, while returning to Thoothukudi. 2 days before, Durai Singam publicly resigns from police and returns to his hometown. Eight months later, he starts working as an NCC master in a Thoothukudi school, and studies the illegal activities happening, for undercover purpose. The only people who know about this operation are the Chief Minister Kumaravel and Ramanathan. Sathya is a +2 student who has heavy infatuation on Singam, though he is waiting to marry his love interest Kavya.

Singam's father Soundara Pandi is enraged about him leaving the police force. He also forbids the marriage between Singam and Kavya, as he fears that Kavya's billionaire father Mahalingam might take Singam away to manage his business empire and that Singam will lose respect with his relatives. Susai, a local who works as peon at Singam's school, shows Singam parts of Thoothukudi and tells him about the rogue happenings in those places. Singam requests Ramanathan to transfer his colleagues Erimalai and Damodarai to assist him. Singam later learns that Sathya is the niece of an influential don named Thangaraj, who is involved in Financial and Seaway Scams. Thangaraj is partners with Bhai, a criminal who controls the southeast coastline of Tamil Nadu.

Bhai and Thangaraj have connections with the international gangster and drug lord Michael Kong, aka Danny, and they are trafficking cocaine. Singam does not know about their connection and keeps Bhai in his off-duty surveillance. One day, due to a verbal fight in a pub, Bhai's chief drug importer Saghayam kidnaps a girl from another caste after her brother (another don) insults him, and holds her ransom until sunset. This causes riots between both gangs in the city, and Singam's school principal has to close the school for the day. With his info connections, Singam learns of the problem, takes charge as new DSP, rescues the girl, and returns her to her family. He is praised by the public and is also forgiven by his father.

Meanwhile, Sathya learns that Kavya and Singam are strongly in love and distances herself from them. Singam then finds out about Thangaraj and Bhai's partnership. He decides to arrest Saghayam first at the harbour, who has brought Danny with him to attend Thangaraj's new hotel party. Sagayam is arrested, along with Danny for insulting the police. Thangaraj tries to make Singam release the duo, but to no avail. Bhai sends an army of goons to bust Danny and Saghayam out of prison. Singam then finds that Danny has escaped, the police station is in ruins, and his fellow officers are injured. All of Singam's efforts are spoiled, and the next morning, he is suspended for unruly behavior. Singam warns Bhai that he knows about Danny and will return soon.

Singam meets Ramanathan at Chennai, and proposes plans for an operation to arrest all of Danny's associates in India. He then gets re-appointed and gets his superior suspended. He gets authorization to kill drug dealers on sight even without evidence. Since the next load of drugs is ready to be delivered by Danny, Bhai decides that Saghayam will deliver the drugs to him in Kerala, and he will bring it back, but he is arrested by Singam. Later, at Singam's engagement function, Mayil Vaaganam's former ally Harbour Shanmugam informs him that Thangaraj has hired goons to attack his home and family that night. Singam fights the goons himself and kills them all. He then places a drug bag insides Thangaraj's house and jails him.

The next day however, Singam gets a call and immediately goes to Sathya's home only find that Sathya has committed suicide by consuming poison, despite previously being told by Singam about her uncle's criminal activities. He analyzes that Sathya was killed by her father as plotted by Thangaraj, whom Singam confronts in prison and ensures that if he cannot prove it by arresting Danny, he will give Thangaraj a death penalty, or else Singam will kill Thangaraj and go to prison instead. Singam seeks permission from Ramanathan for traveling to South Africa as his marriage will take place in three days. Singam arrives in South Africa and joins Major Kyle Ambrose and the police to confront Danny, who has taken sanctuary with Durban-based don Alex. Singam and the Durban police give chase by car, which kills Alex in the process. Singam defeats Alex's men and confronts Danny and his men on his ship. The two fight furiously and ends with Singam's victory over Danny, arresting him, and dragging him to the same cell from which he escaped. Afterwards, he reunites with Kavya.

Cast

Production
Reprising their roles from the original film are Anushka Shetty, Vivek, Vijayakumar, Nassar, and Radha Ravi while Hansika Motwani was signed on as the second female lead. British actor Danny Sapani plays the main antagonist. The actress Anjali is also featured in an item number. Prakash Raj did not return for the sequel, but he can be seen in clips from Singam that are intermittently featured during Singam II. The film was shot mainly in Thiruvananthapuram in Kerala, Tuticorin, Chennai, Tirunelveli and Karaikudi in Tamil Nadu. The director has also filmed some of the key songs, stunts and talkie portions in Durban, Cape Town and Johannesburg in South Africa, as well as Malaysia and Kenya. Primary production began in September 2012 and lasted for seven months until filming was wrapped up on 30 April 2013.

Soundtrack

Development 
Devi Sri Prasad, who had also worked on the score of Singam, returned for Singam II. Bollywood singer Baba Sehgal had recorded a song in the film following the success of his "Kadhal Vandhale" number from the original.  The soundtrack was released on 2 June 2013, a day after its originally scheduled launch in a grand event attended by several celebrities.

Reception 
Times of India gave the album 3/5 stars and stated that "DSP gets a foot-tapping album in Singam 2, though it sounds uncomfortably very similar to Singam." BehindWoods gave the album 2.5 stars out of 5, stating that it is "a straight forward, nothing fancy, DSP album." IndiaGlitz also gave it 2.5 stars in a scale of 5, concluding that the album is "strictly for the masses, targeting the masala aspect."

Release
The release date was confirmed to be 5 July 2013. Singam II released in about 1500 screens worldwide, one of the largest releases for a Tamil film. The film released in a record 151 screens in Kerala and 63 screens in USA.

Critical reception
Oneindia stated, "Singam 2 is a typical Hari style movie, which is routine, loud, long and racy. But he has made it an enjoyable action entertainer." Indiaglitz gave 3 of 5 stars and wrote, "Singam 2 is everything you would look for, love, masala, sentiment, raw Action and so on, however adding a slight overdose to every single element mentioned, as a whole it almost topples over.yet watch it for Suriya." Rediff also rated it 3 out of 5, stating; "the film has a lot of power-packed action sequences and the story races along with a tremendous pace keeping you engaged throughout. In spite of the number of characters in the film, the screenplay is extremely clear cut, with every role outlined beautifully. The only negative would be the length – the movie runs for almost three hours. A slightly shorter version would have created a greater impact".Behindwoods gave a 3.25 out of 5 rating and said; "From the word go, Singam 2 clearly establishes that its fulcrum is only action and the quantity of romance, sentiment and comedy that occupied equal proportion in Singam is less here. Yet, Suriya shoulders the film big time. The sincerity and dedication of this artist is something that needs to be lauded." Deccan Chronicle gave it the verdict: "Even if you are not a Suriya fan, Singam 2 is worth a watch. The film roars rather well."  Zee News commented, "the movie was directed without a soul. Suriya is the only character that makes you feel satisfied in the entire movie." Times of India rated it 3.5 out of 5 and wrote; "If Singam was mass masala, then Singam-2 is doubly so. Hari is clear about what entertainment he wants to dole out to his audiences, and goes about delivering it unapologetically." Baradwaj Rangan of the Hindu wrote "Hari keeps his scenes extremely short, and if this prevents us from forming any sort of lingering attachment with the characters, at least we aren't allowed to dwell on anything long enough to get bored. "News18 rated 2 out of 5 stars stating "'Singam 2' is definitely bigger, but it never gets better in the process of entertaining its viewers."

Other versions
The Telugu dubbed version simply titled Singam, also known as Yamudu II was also released along with the original version on 5 July 2013. The film's Telugu version was distributed by K. E. Gnanavel Raja's Studio Green. A Hindi dubbed version entitled Main Hoon Surya: Singham II was released later on 2 August.

Box office
Singam II had a sold-out opening with as much as 95–100% occupancy. The film collected  on its opening day in Tamil Nadu, Kerala and Karnataka, while the Telugu dubbed version Yamudu II collected . The film grossed a record  on its first weekend worldwide.

In the UK and USA, it earned  and  respectively on its opening weekend. The film earned  in Chennai by the fourth week. According to Sify.com, the film stayed inside the top five positions at Chennai box office continuously for eight weeks after its release and was declared a 'Superhit'. The film completed a 50 days theatrical run on 23 August 2013.

The film's Telugu version Yamudu II was an unusual success and earned  in ten days from Andhra Pradesh.

It performed exceptionally well in the Malaysian market, earning around  within four weeks. The film was the third highest Tamil grosser in Malaysia after Enthiran and Sivaji at that point. Singam II completed 100 days in several screens across Tamil Nadu, Kerala and Andhra Pradesh on 12 October 2013. The film was the second highest-grossing Tamil film of the year 2013 after Vishwaroopam.

However, Forbes stated that the film made 1.36 billion in its lifetime.

Sequel

The third part of the Singam film series was initially scheduled to enter production in December 2015. Suriya and Anushka will reprise their roles. Production on the film was, however, postponed due to climatic conditions in Chennai. Principal photography eventually began on 17 December with the filming of a song sequence, while regular shooting was scheduled to happen later in the month, though it was later moved to January 2016. Regular shooting commenced on 7 January 2016, with the film's title being revealed as Singam 3. After a long gap, continuous postponement of the film release took place. In that while the film's title was changed from Singam 3 to Si 3 for acquiring tax exemption.

Notes

References

External links
 
 

2013 films
2013 action films
2010s Tamil-language films
Indian action films
Indian sequel films
Films directed by Hari (director)
Films set in South Africa
Films set in Canada
Films set in the United States
Films shot in Canada
Films shot in Thoothukudi
Films shot in Chennai
Films shot in Tirunelveli
Films shot in Thiruvananthapuram
Films shot in the United States
Films shot in Gauteng
Films shot in KwaZulu-Natal
Fictional portrayals of the Tamil Nadu Police
Films set in the Indian Ocean
Singam (film series)
Films about the illegal drug trade
Films about the Narcotics Control Bureau